Posht Rud (also Romanized as Posht Rūd and Posht Rood; also known as Kushrūd) is a village in Kork and Nartich Rural District, in the Central District of Bam County, Kerman Province, Iran. At the 2006 census, its population was 2,062, in 543 families.

References 

Populated places in Bam County